Longview were a British indie rock band from Manchester, England.

History
Its members were chief songwriter Rob McVey, guitarist Doug Morch, bassist Aidan Banks and drummer Francesco Mendolia. Original drummer Matt Dabbs left the band for family reasons during 2007. German electronic musician and record producer Ulrich Schnauss joined the band between 2005 and 2010 but left to concentrate on various other projects.
The band formed in Manchester in 2002, and built its reputation with several appearances at The Night and Day Café. Longview subsequently signed to 14th Floor Recordings. Their only album, Mercury, was released in July 2003. Several singles were released from the album including their best known song, "Further", which featured on One Tree Hill and in commercials for the US Open. Notable other releases included a cover of Depeche Mode's "Stripped" which was only available as a digital download or on limited edition vinyl, and "In a Dream".  The band worked on additional songs for what could have been their second album, but nothing was materialised and the band split up in 2015.  Rob McVey is now solo and has been working on his first solo album. In addition to solo work, McVey recently joined a new band titled Paradise which features Sivert Høyem, Simone Butler, and Rob Ellis.

Band members
Robert Duncan McVey - vocals, guitar (2002-2015)
Aidan Banks - bass (2002-2015)
Doug Morch - lead guitar (2002-2015)
Francesco Mendolia - drums (2011–2015)
Matt Dabbs - drums (2002-2007)
Ulrich Schnauss - keyboards (2005–2010)

Discography

Studio albums
Mercury (2003) No. 45 UK, re-issue (2005) No. 29 UK

Remix albums
Subversions (2005)

Singles
"Further" (2002)
"When You Sleep" (2002) No. 74 UK
"Nowhere" (2003) No. 72 UK
"Falling For You" (vinyl only) (2003)
"Electricity" (vinyl only) (2003)
"Further" (second release) (2003) No. 27 UK
"Can't Explain" (2003) No. 51 UK
"Still" (2004) (Not eligible)
"Stripped" (2004) (vinyl only)
"In A Dream" / "River" (2004) No. 38 UK
"Coming Down" / "When You Sleep" (remix) (2005) No. 32 UK
"Further" (remix) (2005) No. 24 UK

References

External links
Facebook Page

English indie rock groups
British shoegaze musical groups
Musical groups from Manchester
Musical groups established in 2002
2002 establishments in the United Kingdom
14th Floor Records artists